Johan Hultberg (born 1985) is a Swedish politician of the Moderate Party. He has been a member of the Riksdag since 2010.

References

Riksdagen: Johan Hultberg (m)

1985 births
Living people
Members of the Riksdag 2010–2014
Members of the Riksdag 2014–2018
Members of the Riksdag 2018–2022
Members of the Riksdag 2022–2026
Members of the Riksdag from the Moderate Party